Khan Mohammad Moinuddin (30 October 193016 February 1981) was a Bangladeshi writer. He was awarded Ekushey Padak in 1978 by the Government of Bangladesh. He is most remembered for being a children's poet in the 1950s and '60s.

Career
At an early age, Moinuddin moved to Calcutta and worked at a Kolkata Binding House as a bookbinder. After completing his primary education, he attended the Calcutta Corporation Teachers' Training College. He later worked in Calcutta Corporation Free Primary School for twenty years.

In 1923, Moinuddin was the editor of the magazine Muslim Jagat. He was sentenced to 6 months in Hooghly Jail for publishing an editorial entitled Bidroha. While incarcerated, he met the poet Kazi Nazrul Islam. In 1947 he moved to Dhaka and established a publishing house Alhamra Library.

Books

Awards
 Bangla Academy Literary Award (1960) 
 UNESCO prize (1960) 
 Ekushey Padak (1978)

References

Recipients of Bangla Academy Award
1930 births
1981 deaths
Bangladeshi male poets
Recipients of the Ekushey Padak
20th-century poets
20th-century male writers